Antoine Carré may refer to:
 Antoine Carré (politician), member of the National Assembly of France
 Antoine Carré (guitarist), baroque guitarist and composer
 Antoine Carre (explorer), French explorer and fur trader